IOF .32 Revolver (also known as IOF 32 Revolver) is a 6-shot handgun designed and manufactured by the Ordnance Factories Organization in India and is meant for short range.

Design
The revolver is a 'Break Action' self-extracting revolver and uses the .32 Smith & Wesson Long (7.65mm x 23mm) cartridge. 

It is based on the Webley Mk IV .38 S&W revolver, specifically the Singapore Police Force version with a safety catch. The smaller caliber was chosen so that it would be legal for civilian ownership under Indian law.

The revolver is priced at Rs.79,263 (approx. $1100 USD in late 2020) (ex-Kanpur) due to a lack of competition from private manufacturers.

IOF also make a lightweight titanium frame version called the Nirbheek and a longer barrel steel frame version called the ANMOL.

See also
Enfield No. 2
Nirbheek
Webley Revolver

References

External links 
 Indian 32-caliber IOR-Mk1 revolver

Revolvers of India
.32 S&W Long firearms
Break-action firearms